The Newton Sutterfield House is a historic house at 1797 Horton Hill Road in Alco, Arkansas.  It is a single-story double-pen log structure, finished in weatherboard siding and topped by a gable roof.  A porch extends across the front, sheltering separate entrances into each pen.  The house's construction date is uncertain, but is estimated to be about 1850.  It is one of Stone County's few pre-Civil War structures to survive.

The house was listed on the National Register of Historic Places in 2003.

See also
National Register of Historic Places listings in Stone County, Arkansas

References

Houses on the National Register of Historic Places in Arkansas
Houses completed in 1850
Buildings and structures in Stone County, Arkansas
National Register of Historic Places in Stone County, Arkansas